Yramea is a genus of butterflies in the family Nymphalidae commonly found in South America.

Taxonomy
The genus Yramea is sometimes included in Issoria as a subgenus.

Species
Listed alphabetically:
Yramea cytheris (Drury, [1773])
Yramea inca (Staudinger, 1894)
Yramea lathonioides (Blanchard, 1852)
Yramea lynx Lamas & Grados 2004
Yramea modesta (Blanchard, 1852)
Yramea sobrina (Weymer, 1890)

References

Argynnini
Nymphalidae genera